Asbestosdeath was an American doom metal band from San Jose, California, the precursor to the highly influential band Sleep.

History 
Asbestosdeath started life in the late 1980s as a trio consisting of Al Cisneros on bass, Chris Hakius on drums, and Tom Choi on guitar. Matt Pike later joined as a second guitarist. They recorded two 7"s: their first (Unclean, 1989) was self-released (Asbestos Records) and a second 7" (Dejection, 1990) was released later that year by Profane Existence. Choi left Asbestosdeath to form Noothgrush after the release of the second 7". The band recruited Justin Marler to replace Choi and changed their name to Sleep.

In 2007, Southern Lord Records reissued Asbestosdeath's two 7"s on CD and 10" vinyl. The four songs on the album comprise the entirety of Asbestosdeath's recordings.

Band members 
 Al Cisneros – bass
 Chris Hakius – drums
 Tom Choi – guitar
 Matt Pike – guitar
 Keith Krate – guitar

Discography 
 Unclean 7" (1989 Asbestos Records)
 Dejection 7" (1990 Profane Existence)
 Dejection/Unclean CD/10" (2007 Southern Lord Records)

References

External links 

Asbestosdeath at MySpace

American doom metal musical groups
Heavy metal musical groups from California
Musical groups established in 1989
Musical groups from San Jose, California